Carleton Oats (born 1942) is an American college and professional football player. A defensive lineman, he played collegiately for Florida A&M and professionally in the AFL, NFL and WFL  with the Oakland Raiders (1965-1972), the Green Bay Packers (1973) and the Southern California Sun (1974). While pass-rushing in Oakland, he would sometimes jump at unusual heights over offensive linemen.

See also
Other American Football League players

Florida A&M Rattlers football players
Oakland Raiders players
Green Bay Packers players
1942 births
Living people
American football defensive linemen
Players of American football from Florida
American Football League players